(abbreviated ), sometimes anglicised as Syntagmatarch, is used in modern Greek to denote the rank of colonel. It is translated as "leader of a regiment (syntagma)", and dates back to the Classical Age armies. However, the name is misleading in that the Hellenic Army retains very few regiments in its command structure. Thus, the typical responsibilities of Syntagmatarches are in staff positions, or as executive officers in brigades. Officers holding this rank should be addressed as Kyrie Syntagmatarcha (Κύριε Συνταγματάρχα).

In the modern Hellenic Army the rank is superior to an Antisyntagmatarchis (Lieutenant Colonel) and inferior to a Taxiarchos (Brigadier). The insignia consists of a flaming grenade and three golden stars.

The Greek junta, a military dictatorship which ruled the country from 1967 until 1974, is also known as "The Regime of the Colonels" because most of its chief leaders were of Colonel rank, including two of the three chief leaders, George Papadopoulos and Nikolaos Makarezos.

Rank insignia

References

Hellenic Army officers
Military ranks of Greece
Military ranks of ancient Greece